The Rouran Khaganate, also Juan-Juan Khaganate, was a tribal confederation and later state founded by a people of Proto-Mongolic Donghu origin. The Rouran supreme rulers are noted for being the first to use the title of "khagan", having borrowed this popular title from the Xianbei. The Rouran Khaganate lasted from the late 4th century until the middle 6th century, when they were defeated by a Göktürk rebellion which subsequently led to the rise of the Turks in world history.

Their Khaganate overthrown, some Rouran remnants possibly became Tatars while others possibly migrated west and became the Pannonian Avars (known by such names as Varchonites or Pseudo Avars), who settled in Pannonia (centred on modern Hungary) during the 6th century. These Avars were pursued into the Byzantine Empire by the Göktürks, who referred to the Avars as a slave or vassal people, and requested that the Byzantines expel them. While this Rouran-Avars link remains a controversial theory, a recent DNA study has confirmed the genetic origins of the Avar elite as originating from the Mongolian plains. Other theories instead link the origins of the Pannonian Avars to peoples such as the Uar.

Considered an imperial confederation, the Rouran Khaganate was based on the "distant exploitation of agrarian societies", although many researchers claim that the Rouran had a feudal system, or "nomadic feudalism". The Rouran controlled trade routes, and raided and subjugated oases and outposts such as Gaochang. Their society is said to show the signs of "both an early state and a chiefdom". The Rouran have been credited as "a band of steppe robbers", because they adopted a strategy of raids and extortion of Northern China. The Khaganate was an aggressive militarized society, a "military-hierarchical polity established to solve the exclusively foreign-policy problems of requisitioning surplus products from neighbouring nations and states."

Name

Nomenclature
Róurán 柔然 is a Classical Chinese transcription of the endonym of the confederacy; 蠕蠕 Ruǎnruǎn ~ Rúrú (Weishu), however, was used in Tuoba-Xianbei sources such as orders given by Emperor Taiwu of Northern Wei. It meant something akin to "wriggling worm" and was used in a derogatory sense. Other transcriptions are 蝚蠕 Róurú ~ Róuruǎn (Jinshu); 茹茹 Rúrú (Beiqishu, Zhoushu, Suishu); 芮芮 Ruìruì (Nanqishu, Liangshu, Songshu), 大檀 Dàtán and 檀檀 Tántán (Songshu).

Mongolian Sinologist Sühe Baatar suggests Nirun Нирун as the modern Mongolian term for the Rouran, as Нирун resembles reconstructed Chinese forms beginning with *ń- or *ŋ-. Rashid-al-Din Hamadani recorded Niru'un and Dürlükin as two divisions of the Mongols.

Etymology
Klyastorny reconstructed the ethnonym behind the Chinese transcription 柔然 Róurán (LHC: *ńu-ńan; EMC: *ɲuw-ɲian > LMC: *riw-rian) as *nönör and compares it to Mongolic нөкүр nökür "friend, comrade, companion" (Khalkha нөхөр nöhör). According to Klyashtorny, *nönör denotes "stepnaja vol'nica" "a free, roving band in the steppe, the 'companions' of the early Rouran leaders". In early Mongol society, a nökür was someone who had left his clan or tribe to pledge loyalty to and serve a charismatic warlord; if this derivation were correct, Róurán 柔然 was originally not an ethnonym, but a social term referring the dynastic founder's origins or the core circle of companions who helped him build his state.

However, Golden identifies philological problems: the ethnonym should have been *nöŋör to be cognate to nökür, & possible assimilation of -/k/- to -/n/- in Chinese transcription needs further linguistic proofs. Even if 柔然 somehow transmitted nökür, it more likely denoted the Rouran's status as the subjects of the Tuoba. Before being used as an ethnonym, Rouran had originally been the byname of chief Cheluhui (车鹿会), possibly denoting his status "as a Wei servitor".

History

Origin
Primary Chinese-language sources Songshu and Liangshu connected Rouran to the earlier Xiongnu (of unknown ethnolinguistic affiliation) while Weishu traced the Rouran's origins back to the Donghu, generally agreed to be Proto-Mongols. Xu proposed that "the main body of the Rouran were of Xiongnu origin" and Rourans' descendants, namely Da Shiwei (aka Tatars), contained Turkic elements, besides Mongolic Xianbei. Even so, the Xiongnu's language is still unknown and Chinese historians routinely ascribed Xiongnu origins to various nomadic groups, yet such ascriptions do not necessarily indicate the subjects' exact origins: for examples, Xiongnu ancestry was ascribed to Turkic-speaking Göktürks and Tiele as well as Para-Mongolic-speaking Kumo Xi and Khitans. However, historical developments show that the Xiongnu subsequently conquered Dong-Hu, the common ancestor of the Kitan and Kumo Xi peoples.

Kwok Kin Poon additionally proposes that the Rouran were descended specifically from Donghu's Xianbei lineage, i.e. from Xianbei who remained in the eastern Eurasian Steppe after most Xianbei had migrated south and settled in Northern China. Genetic testings on Rourans' remains suggested Donghu-Xianbei paternal genetic contribution to Rourans.

Khaganate

The founder of the Rouran Khaganate, Yujiulu Shelun, was said to be descended from the mythological founder Mugulü, who, according to Chinese-language chronicles (Weishu, Beishi), was captured and enslaved by Xianbei raiders. The anecdote of the founder of the Rouran being a slave is a "typical insertion by the Chinese historians intended to show the low birth and barbarian nature of the northern nomads". The endonym Rouran itself was distorted by the Sinicized Tuoba Xianbei into exonyms Ruru or Ruanruan, meaning something akin to "wriggling worms". After the Xianbei migrated south and settled in Chinese lands during the late 3rd century AD, the Rouran made a name for themselves as fierce warriors. However they remained politically fragmented until 402 AD when Shelun gained support of all the Rouran chieftains and united the Rouran under one banner. Immediately after uniting, the Rouran entered a perpetual conflict with Northern Wei, beginning with a Wei offensive that drove the Rouran from the Ordos region. The Rouran expanded westward and defeated the neighboring Tiele people and expanded their territory over the Silk Roads, even vassalizing the Hephthalites which remained so until the beginning of the 5th century.

The Hepthalites migrated southeast due to pressure from the Rouran and displaced the Yuezhi in Bactria, forcing them to migrate further south. Despite the conflict between the Hephthalites and Rouran, the Hephthalites borrowed much from their eastern overlords, in particular the title of "Khan" which was first used by the Rouran as a title for their rulers.

The Rouran were considered vassals by Tuoba Wei. By 506 they were considered a vassal state. They were considered equal partners by the Chinese empire. Following the growth of Rouran and the turning of Wei into a classical Chinese state, they were considered partners of equal rights by Wei (lindi gangli).

In 424, the Rouran invaded Northern Wei but were repulsed.

In 429, Northern Wei launched a major offensive against the Rouran and killed a large number of people.

In 434, the Rouran entered a marriage alliance with Northern Wei. In 443, Northern Wei attacked the Rouran. In 449, the Rouran were defeated in battle by Northern Wei. In 456, Northern Wei attacked the Rouran. In 458, Northern Wei attacked the Rouran.

In 460, the Rouran subjugated the Ashina tribe residing around modern Turpan and resettled them in the Altai Mountains. The Rouran also ousted the previous dynasty of Gaochang and installed Kan Bozhou as its king.

In 492, Emperor Tuoba Hong sent 70 thousand horsemen against Rouran. Because Chinese sources are silent about the outcome of the expedition, it is probable that it was unsuccessful. However, possibly strained after the battle with Wei, the Rourans were not able to prevent the Uighur chief Abuzhiluo from heading "a 100 thousand tents" west, in a series of events that led to the overthrowing and killing of Doulun Khan. Two armies were sent in pursuit of the rebels, one led by Doulun, the other by Nagai, his uncle. The Rouran emerged victorious. In the war against the Uighurs, Doulan fought well, but his uncle Nagai won all the battles against the Uighurs. Thus, the soldiers thought that Heaven  didn't favor Doulan anymore, and that he should be deposed in favor of Nagai. The latter, who was faithful to traditions, declined. Nonetheless, the subjects killed Doulan and murdered his next of kin, installing Nagai on the throne. In 518, Nagai married the sorceress Diwan, conferring her the title of khagatun for her outstanding service.

Between 525 and 527, Rouran was employed by Northern Wei in the suppression of rebellions in their territory, with the Rourans then plundering the local population.

The Rouran Khaganate arranged for one of their princesses, Khagan Yujiulü Anagui's daughter Princess Ruru, to be married to the Han Chinese ruler Gao Huan of the Eastern Wei.

Heqin
The Rourans were involved many times in Royal intermarriage (also known as Heqin in China), with the Northern Yan and especially with the Northern Wei dynasty and its successors Eastern and Western Wei, which were fighting each other, and each seeking the support of Rouran to defeat the other. These royal intermarriages meant instances of Chinese dynasties' princesses marrying Rouran princes or khagans (e.g. Princess Lelang, Princess Lanling) and Rouran princesses marrying Chinese dynasties' rulers and princes (e.g. Princess Ruru, Empress Gong). Both parties, in turn, took the initiative of proposing such marriages to forge important alliances or solidify relations, with the warring Western Wei and Eastern Wei often seeking the Rourans in the latter period. The so-called "diplomatic princesses" were well treated and honored on both sides.

In the 1970s, the Tomb of Princess Linhe was unearthed in Ci County, Hebei. It contained artistically invaluable murals, a mostly pillaged but still consistent treasure, Byzantine coins and about a thousand vessels and clay figurines. Among the latter was the figurine of a Shaman, standing in a dancing posture and holding a saw-like instrument. The Rouran would often visit the Eastern Wei, who were sometimes allies, sometimes rivals, and this figurine is thought to reflect the young princess' Rouran/nomadic roots.

On one occasion, in 540, the Rourans attacked Western Wei reportedly with a million warriors because a Rouran princess reported being dissatisfied with being second to Emperor Wendi's principal wife.

The first khagan Shelun is said to have concluded a “treaty of peace based on kinship” with the rulers of Jin. The royal house of Rouran is also said to have intermarried with the royal house of the Haital (Hephthalites) in the 6th century.

Society
Since the time of Shelun Khan, the khans were bestowed with additional titles at their enthronement. Since 464, starting with Yucheng Khan they started to use epoch names, like the Chinese. The Rouran dignitaries of the ruling elite also adopted nicknames, referring to their deeds, similarly to the titles the Chinese gave posthumously. This practice is analogous with that of later Mongolian chiefs. There was a wide circle composing the nomadic aristocracy, including elders, chieftains, military commanders. The grandees could be high or low ranking. The khagan could confer titles in reward of services rendered and outstanding deeds, such as in 518, when Nagai entitled the sorceress Diwai khagatun, taking her as his wife, and gave a compensation, a post and a title to Fushengmou, her then former husband. The Rouran titles included ,  (cf. Mongolian batur, baghatur),  (cf. Turkic irkin),  (cf. Turkic eltäbär).

Sources indicate that slave ownership existed among the Rouran. In 521, Khagan Anagui was given two female slaves as a gift from the Chinese; included among the penalties and rewards introduced with the reorganization of the military and the state carried out by Shelun, there was the regulation that soldiers who fought outstandingly would receive captives. There is also evidence that the Rouran resettled people in the steppe.

Initially the Rouran chiefs, according to Chinese sources, having no letters to make records, "counted approximately the number of warriors by using sheep's droppings". Later, they made records using notches on wood. They adopted the Chinese written language, using it to make records and write diplomatic letters, and, with Anagui, started using it to write internal records. There is also evidence of a large number of literate people among the Rouran. This high level of literacy reportedly didn't affect only the elites, but also common people such as cattle-breeders, who were able to use ideograms. In the Book of Song there is the story of an educated Rouran "whose knowledge shamed a wise Chinese functionary". Further, it is not excluded that they had their own runic script. There is no record of monuments erected by the Rouran, though there is evidence of the latter requesting doctors, weavers and other artisans to be sent from China.

Imitating the Chinese, Anagui Khan introduced the use of officials at court, adopted a staff of bodyguards, or chamberlains, and "surrounded himself with advisers trained in the tradition of Chinese bibliophily". His chief advisor was the Chinese Shunyu Tan, whose role is comparable to that of Yelü Chucai with the Mongols and Zhonghang Yue with the Xiongnu (or Huns).

Capital
The capital of the Rouran likely changed over time. The headquarters of the Rouran Khan (ting) was initially northwest of Gansu.
Later the capital of the Rouran became Mumocheng, "encircled with two walls constructed by Liang Shu". The existence of this city would be proof of early urbanization among the Rouran. However, its location is disputed, and no trace of it has been found so far.

Decline
In 461, Lü Pi, Duke of Hedong, a Northern Wei general and Grand chancellor of Rouran descent, dies in Northern Wei. The Rouran and the Hephthalites had a falling out and problems within their confederation were encouraged by Chinese agents.

In 508, the Tiele defeated the Rouran in battle. In 516, the Rouran defeated the Tiele. In 551, Bumin of the Ashina Göktürks quelled a Tiele revolt for the Rouran and asked for a Rouran princess for his service. The Rouran refused and in response Bumin declared independence.

Bumin entered a marriage alliance with Western Wei, a successor state of Northern Wei, and attacked the Rouran in 552. The Rouran, now at the peak of their might, were defeated by the Turks. After a defeat at Huaihuang (in present-day Zhangjiakou, Hebei) the last great khan Anagui, realizing he had been defeated, took his own life. Bumin declared himself Illig Khagan of the Turkic Khaganate after conquering Otuken; Bumin died soon after and his son Issik Qaghan succeeded him. Issik continued attacking the Rouran, their khaganate now fallen into decay, but died a year later in 553.

In 555, Turks invaded and occupied the Rouran and Yujiulü Dengshuzi led 3000 soldiers in retreat to Western Wei. He was later delivered to Turks by Emperor Gong with his soldiers under pressure from Muqan Qaghan. In the same year, Muqan is said to have annihilated the Rouran. All the Rouran handed over to the Turks, reportedly with the exception of children less than sixteen, were brutally killed.

On 29 November 586 Yujiulü Furen (郁久闾伏仁), an official of Sui and a descendant of the ruling clan, dies in Hebei, leaving an epitaph reporting his royal descent from the Yujiulü clan.

Possible descendants

Tatars
According to Xu (2005), some Rouran remnants fled to the northwest of the Greater Khingan mountain range, and renamed themselves 大檀 Dàtán (MC: *daH-dan) or 檀檀 Tántán (MC: *dan-dan) after Tantan, personal name of a historical Rouran Khagan. Tantan were gradually incorporated into the Shiwei tribal complex and later emerged as Great-Da Shiwei (大室韋) in Suishu. Klyashtorny, apud Golden (2013), reconstructed 大檀 / 檀檀 as *tatar / dadar, "the people who, [Klyashtorny] concludes, assisted Datan in the 420s in his internal struggles and who later are noted as the Otuz Tatar ("Thirty Tatars") who were among the mourners at the funeral of Bumın Qağan (see the inscriptions of Kül Tegin, E4 and Bilge Qağan, E5)".

Avars
Some scholars claim that the Rouran then fled west across the steppes and became the Avars, though many other scholars contest this claim. New genetic data seem to answer that question, says Walter Pohl, a historian at the University of Vienna. “We have a very clear indication that they must have come from the core of the Rouran Empire. They were the neighbors of the Chinese.” “Genetically speaking, the elite Avars have a very, very eastern profile,” says Choongwon Jeong, a co-author and a geneticist at Seoul National University.

That genetic data backs up two historical accounts of the Avar’s origins. One sixth century Chinese source describes an enigmatic steppe people called the Rouran, one of many horse-riding nomadic groups that swept out of the Mongolian steppes to attack their northern borders. The Rouran’s grassland empire was reportedly defeated by rival nomads in 552 C.E. A continent away, and just 15 years later, diplomats from Byzantium, the eastern remnants of the once-mighty Roman Empire, reported the arrival of a new group from the east on the shores of the Caspian Sea. The newcomers called themselves the Avars, and claimed to be related to a far-off people known as the Rouran.

However, it's unlikely that Rouran would have migrated to Europe in any sufficient strength to establish themselves there, due to the desperate resistances, military disasters, and massacres. The remainder of the Rouran fled into China, were absorbed into the border guards, and disappeared forever as an entity. The last khagan fled to the court of the Western Wei, but at the demand of the Göktürks, Western Wei executed him and the nobles who accompanied him.

The Avars were pursued west by the Gokturks as most-wanted fugitives and accused of unlawfully usurping the imperial title of Khagan and also the prestigious name of the Avars. Contemporary sources indicate the Avars were not native to the Western Steppe but came to the region after a long wandering. Nor were they native to Central Asia to the south of which lay the Hephthalite Empire which has on and off been identified with the Avars by certain scholars. Instead the Avars' origins were further to the east, a fact which has been corroborated through DNA studies of Avar individuals buried in the Pannonian Basin which have shown that they were primarily East Asian. Their pretensions to empire despite their relatively small numbers indicate descendance from a previously hegemonic power in the Far East. The first embassy of the Avars to Justinian I in 557 corresponds directly to the fall of the Rouran Khaganate in 555. The Rouran Khaganate had fallen not through gradual decline but through a sudden internal revolution led by the Göktürks, hence the still vivid memories of empire in the Avar Khagan, a fact paralleled later by the Kara-Khitans who migrated a long distance west after being suddenly dislodged from northern China but still kept their pretensions to empire and defeated the Great Seljuk Empire in the Battle of Qatwan as the Western Liao. The Hephthalite Empire in southern Central Asia would not fall to the Göktürks until 560. The Hephthalites themselves had previously been vassals to the Rouran and adopted the title Khagan from them. They were also already known as the Hephthalites to the Byzantines. In view of these facts a strong Rouran component in the Avar Khaganate has been seen as likely, although the Khaganate later included many other peoples such as Slavs and Goths.

Genetics

 examined the remains of a Rouran male buried at the Khermen Tal site in Mongolia. He was found to be a carrier of the paternal haplogroup C2b1a1b and the maternal haplogroup D4b1a2a1. Haplogroup C2b1a1b has also been detected among the Xianbei.

Several genetic studies have shown that early Pannonian Avar elites carried a large amount of East Asian ancestry, and some have suggested this as evidence for a connection between the Pannonian Avars and the  earlier Rouran. However,  notes that there is still little genetic data on the Rouran themselves, and that their genetic relationship with the Pannonian Avars therefore still remains inconclusive.

Language 

The received view is that the relationships of the language remain a puzzle and that it may be an isolate. Alexander Vovin (2004, 2010) considers the Ruan-ruan language to be an extinct non-Altaic language that is not related to any modern-day language (i.e., a language isolate) and is hence unrelated to Mongolic. Vovin (2004) notes that Old Turkic had borrowed some words from an unknown non-Altaic language that may have been Ruan-ruan. In 2018 Vovin changed his opinion after new evidence was found through the analysis of the Brāhmī Bugut and Khüis Tolgoi inscriptions and suggests that the Ruanruan language was in fact a Mongolic language, close but not identical to Middle Mongolian.

Rulers of the Rouran 
The Rourans were the first people who used the titles Khagan and Khan for their emperors, replacing the Chanyu of the Xiongnu. The etymology of the title Chanyu is controversial: there are Mongolic, Turkic, Yeniseian versions.

Tribal chiefs 

Mugulü, 4th century
Yujiulü Cheluhui, 4th century
Yujiulü Tunugui, 4th century
Yujiulü Bati, 4th century
Yujiulü Disuyuan, 4th century
Yujiulü Pihouba, 4th century
Yujiulü Wenheti, 4th century
Yujiulü Heduohan, 4th century

Khagans

Khagans of West 

Yujiulü Dengshuzi, 555

Khagans of East 

 Yujiulü Tiefa, 552–553
 Yujiulü Dengzhu, 553
 Yujiulü Kangti, 553
 Yujiulü Anluochen, 553–554

Rulers family tree 

== See also ==
History of the eastern steppe

Notes

References

Citations

Sources 

 
Findley, Carter Vaughn. (2005). The Turks in World History. Oxford University Press.  (cloth);  (pbk).
Golden, Peter B. "Some Notes on the Avars and Rouran", in The Steppe Lands and the World beyond Them. Ed. Curta, Maleon. Iași (2013). pp. 43–66.
Grousset, René. (1970). The Empire of the Steppes: a History of Central Asia. Translated by Naomi Walford. Rutgers University Press. New Brunswick, New Jersey, U.S.A.Third Paperback printing, 1991.  (casebound);  (pbk).
 
 
Map of their empire
Definition 
information about the Rouran 
Kradin, Nikolay. "From Tribal Confederation to Empire: the Evolution of the Rouran Society". Acta Orientalia Academiae Scientiarum Hungaricae, Vol. 58, No 2 (2005): 149–169.

External links 
 

 
Khanates
History of Mongolia
Nomadic groups in Eurasia
Ancient peoples of China
Former countries in Chinese history
Inner Asia
States and territories established in the 4th century
555 disestablishments
States and territories disestablished in the 6th century
330 establishments
Donghu people
Former confederations
Former empires